Pumptown (also known as Pumptown Corners) is an unincorporated community located within Edison Township in Middlesex County, New Jersey, United States.

Pumptown is named after a public pump that stood in the middle of the intersection of Park Ave. and Plainfield Rd. 

It is a suburban neighborhood (based on population density), its real estate primarily made up of medium-sized (three- or four-bedroom) to large (four- or more bedroom) single-family homes and townhomes. Most of the residential real estate is owner-occupied. Many are older, well-established, built between 1940 and 1969. A number of residences were also built between 1970 and 1999.

See also
List of neighborhoods in Edison, New Jersey

References

Neighborhoods in Edison, New Jersey
Unincorporated communities in Middlesex County, New Jersey
Unincorporated communities in New Jersey